Pirkeh-ye Olya (also Romanized as Pīrkeh-ye ‘Olyā and Pīrgeh-ye ‘Olyā) is a village in Qaleh-ye Mozaffari Rural District, in the Central District of Selseleh County, Lorestan Province, Iran. At the 2006 census, its population was 97, in 22 families.

References 

Towns and villages in Selseleh County